HomeAdvisor is a digital marketplace formerly known as ServiceMagic. It connects homeowners with local service professionals to carry out home improvement, maintenance and remodeling projects.

HomeAdvisor is headquartered in Denver, Colorado and has offices in Evanston, Illinois; Fairfax, Virginia; Lenexa, Kansas; New York, New York; Indianapolis, Indiana; and Colorado Springs, Colorado.

HomeAdvisor incorporates home improvement project planning resources like True Cost Guide, where customers can view average project costs. It is free to homeowners, and a paid network for service professionals.

According to the company, professionals registered on HomeAdvisor network are prescreened and must pass criminal and financial background checks.

On October 2, 2017, HomeAdvisor acquired Angie’s List and renamed itself ANGI Homeservices (NASDAQ: ANGI), the world’s largest digital marketplace for home services. IAC is now a majority shareholder in ANGI Homeservices, which is the parent company of HomeAdvisor. ANGI Homeservices operates 10 brands in eight countries, including HomeAdvisor, Angie’s List, mHelpDesk, HomeStars (Canada), MyHammer (Germany), MyBuilder (UK), Werkspot (Netherlands), Instapro (Italy) and Travaux.com (France).

History
HomeAdvisor, launched as ServiceMagic, was founded in 1998 by Rodney Rice and Michael Beaudoin who were part of the founding management team of Einstein Bros Bagels. In 2004, InterActive Corp (NASDAQ: IAC) acquired the website for an undisclosed price.

In January 2008, IAC appointed Craig Smith as CEO of ServiceMagic Inc. He was the Senior Vice President of the company’s Consumer Division. Co-founders Rodney Rice and Michael Beaudoin became co-chairmen and advisors. ServiceMagic remained part of the parent company when IAC split into five publicly traded companies.

In October 2008, ServiceMagic acquired the French business 123Devis.com and Travaux.com, as well as UK business 123GetAQuote.co.uk to create ServiceMagic Europe. In March 2009, the UK business was rebranded as ServiceMagic.co.uk.

In April 2011, Chris Terrill was hired as Chief Executive Officer. In October 2012, ServiceMagic rebranded as HomeAdvisor.

After rebranding, then-CEO Chris Terrill told StreetFight Magazine, “We’re the only network for this type of on-demand service.” 

In 2013, HomeAdvisor acquired Werkspot.nl, the leading Dutch home improvement platform.

By 2015, HomeAdvisor had achieved more than $300 million in annual revenue, been used by more than 30 million homeowners, had nearly 100,000 pre-screened service professionals in its network and almost 3 million verified reviews.

In 2016, HomeAdvisor acquired the German home services company, MyHammer.

In 2017, HomeAdvisor acquired Canada’s leading home services platform, HomeStars, and MyBuilder, the UK's leading home services platform connecting homeowners and tradesmen.

On May 1, 2017, HomeAdvisor parent company IAC announced they entered into a definitive agreement to combine IAC’s HomeAdvisor and Angie’s List into a new publicly traded company, to be called ANGI Homeservices, Inc.

On October 2, 2017, HomeAdvisor merged with Angie’s List to form ANGI Homeservices (NASDAQ: ANGI), the world’s largest digital marketplace for home services.

Technology

Instant Booking, launched in 2015 allows homeowners to instantly schedule appointments with service professionals and “eliminate phone tag between the provider and homeowner, which is how the service worked before.”

Instant Connect, a service where “homeowners are contacted by a HomeAdvisor specialist via phone within one to two minutes.”

Same Day Service allows homeowners to instantly schedule an appointment to complete their home project the same day.

Homeowners can also make appointments using HomeAdvisor through Facebook.

HomeAdvisor also integrates smart devices like Apple Watch and Amazon Echo.

Criticism
 
Several news articles have reported on the screening process of HomeAdvisor, investigating possible loopholes available to contractors that have been used by criminals. Denver investigative reporter Heidi Hemmat wrote one such story about a client that used a contractor recommended by HomeAdvisor to put in a concrete driveway. The recommended "local" company did not complete the work, demanded payment upfront and any work that was performed needed to be redone. The company recommended was from Avon CO and did not have a business license.

Although HomeAdvisor currently has a BBB rating of A−, the rating had been as low as a "B", in 2017. There are over 600 negative reviews of the service on the BBB website.  However, the HomeAdvisor brand has as high as a 4.4 out of 5 on sites like ConsumerAffairs and Trust Pilot but as low as a 2.8 out of 5 on SiteJabber.

HomeAdvisor has also received data security concerns over its use of Home Improvement Industry practices known as Pay Per Lead Services. HomeAdvisor collects users data when a request is made and then sells that data to local contractors in exchange for money. A previous claim that homeowners are unaware that their data is being sold to contractors has been refuted by HomeAdvisor via their own language used on their "contact forms" on their website. A standard CCPA/TCPA disclaimer is included at or above the "submit" button, which states "By clicking View Matching Pros, you affirm you have read and agree to the HomeAdvisor Terms, and you agree and authorize HomeAdvisor and its affiliates, and their networks of Service Professionals, to deliver marketing calls or texts using automated technology to the number you provided above regarding your project and other home services offers. Consent is not a condition of purchase." This and other standard disclaimers have been present on HomeAdvisor and their other sites like Angie's List since the inception of the company. The practice of selling leads to businesses is common in the online marketing space. Sites like HomeAdvisor are clear about being a marketplace for consumers to find contractors to help complete their project. Thus, the intent of each user is to be connected to a business when they complete any contact form available on the corresponding site.

References

External links
 

Companies based in Golden, Colorado
Home improvement
Online marketplaces of the United States
IAC (company)
American companies established in 1998
Internet properties established in 1998
2017 mergers and acquisitions